ČT Sport is a Czech national sports channel, operated by Czech Television.

History
ČT Sport was launched on 10 February 2006 at 'ČT4 Sport', to promote digital television, its main programmes include football, ice hockey, the Olympic Games, athletics and European events.

In 2008, the channel dropped 'Sport' from its name, becoming 'ČT4'. With the full rebranding of Česká televize in September 2012, the channel name was changed to 'ČT Sport'.

The channel is available through digital terrestrial television, satellite and cable operators.

ČT Sport HD 

ČT Sport HD is the high-definition simulcast of ČT Sport, launched on 3 May 2012. The channel broadcasts via IPTV, digital terrestrial (in several areas only) and satellite (via Astra 3B – DVB-S2 standard).

Previously HD programming was shown on ČT HD, covering ČT1, ČT2 and ČT4.

Sport

Athletics 
 World Athletics Indoor Championships
 World Athletics Championships

Basketball 
 FIBA Basketball World Cup
 FIBA Women's Basketball World Cup
 FIBA EuroBasket
 FIBA Women's EuroBasket
 National Basketball League

Cycling 
 Tour de France
 Tour of Flanders
 UCI Road World Championships

Floorball 
 Men's, Women's and Under-19 World Floorball Championships
 Champions Cup
 Czech Open
 Superliga florbalu

Football 
 Czech National Football League
 Czech Cup
 FIFA World Cup
 UEFA European Championship
 UEFA Europa League
 UEFA Europa Conference League
 UEFA Nations League

Ice Hockey 
 Chance Liga
 Ice Hockey World Championship
 Spengler Cup
 Tipsport Extraliga

Motorsport 
 Dakar Rally
 Czech Rally Championship
 World Rally Championships

Multi-sport Event 
 European Championships
 European Games
 Olympic Summer Games
 Olympic Winter Games
 Paralympic Summer Games
 Paralympic Winter Games

Tennis 
 ATP Cup
 Billie Jean King Cup
 Davis Cup

Winter Sports 
 Biathlon World Championships
 FIS Alpine Ski World Cup
 FIS Cross-Country World Cup
 FIS Ski Jumping World Cup
 FIS Snowboard World Cup
 FIS Alpine World Ski Championships
 FIS Freestyle World Ski Championships
 FIS Nordic World Ski Championships
 FIS Ski Flying World Championships
 FIS Snowboarding World Championships
 Four Hills Tournament
 IBU Biathlon World Cup
 ISU Speed Skating World Cup
 World Single Distances Speed Skating Championships for Women

Volleyball 
 Czech Men's Volleyball Extraliga
 Czech Women's Volleyball Extraliga
 FIVB Volleyball Men's World Championship
 FIVB Volleyball Women's World Championship
 Men's European Volleyball Championship
 Women's European Volleyball Championship

Logos

External links
Official website

Television stations in the Czech Republic
Sports television networks
Olympics on television
Television channels and stations established in 2006
2006 establishments in the Czech Republic
Czech-language television stations
Czech Television